Amira Nowaira is an Egyptian academic, translator, columnist and author. She gained her doctorate in English literature from Birmingham University. She has served as chair of the English department at Alexandria University, and is currently a professor there. She has published a number scholarly books and journal articles. More recently, she has contributed journalistic pieces to The Guardian. Apart from her own books, Nowaira has also done translations, both from Arabic to English (Ali Bader, Taha Hussein et al.) and from English to Arabic (Susan Bassnett, Randa Abdel-Fattah et al.).

Books

As author/editor
 Islam, Gender and Modernity (author)
 Growing Up Feminist in a Muslim Land (author)
 Women Writing Africa: The Northern Region (co-editor)

As translator
 Zeina by Nawal El Saadawi (Arabic to English)
 Zubaida's Window by Iqbal Qazwini (co-translator with Azza El Kholy; Arabic to English)
 The Tobacco Keeper by Ali Bader (Arabic to English)
 The Future of Culture in Egypt by Taha Hussein (Arabic to English)
 Comparative Literature: A Critical Introduction by Susan Bassnett (English to Arabic)
 Where the Streets Had a Name by Randa Abdel Fattah (co-translator with Nabil Nowaira; English to Arabic)

See also
 List of Arabic-English translators

References

Egyptian writers
Egyptian translators
Arabic–English translators
Egyptian women writers
Alumni of the University of Birmingham
Living people
Academic staff of Alexandria University
Year of birth missing (living people)